Haematocarpus is a plant genus in the family Menispermaceae and found in south-east Asia.

Species 
 Haematocarpus subpeltatus Miers - type species – synonyms: Fibraurea elliptica, Fibraureopsis smilacifolia
 Haematocarpus validus  (Miers) Bakh.f. ex Forman - synonyms: Baterium validum, Fibraurea haematocarpus, Haematocarpus comptus, H. incusus, H. thomsonii

References

External links
 

Flora of Indo-China
Menispermaceae genera